Prince Pál Antal Esterházy de Galántha (German: Paul Anton Esterházy von Galantha; 11 March 178621 May 1866) was a Hungarian prince, a member of the famous Esterházy family.  He was the son of Prince Nikolaus II and succeeded his father on the latter's death in 1833.

The basis of his wealth

For several generations, the Esterházy family had been exceedingly wealthy.  The wealth came from their extensive landholdings, mostly in Hungary. In 1848 the American author John Stevens Cabot Abbott wrote the following of him:

[In Hungary,] the feudal system still exists in all its ancient barbaric splendor. Prince Esterhazy, a Hungarian baron, is probably the richest man, who is not seated on a throne, in the world. He lives in the highest style of earthly grandeur. One of his four magnificent palaces contains three hundred and sixty rooms for guests, and a theater. His estates embrace one hundred and thirty villages, forty towns, and thirty-four castles. By the old feudal law, still undisturbed, he possesses unlimited power over his vassals, and can imprison, scourge, and slay at pleasure ... He has quite a little band of troops in his pay, and moves with military pomp and gorgeous retinue from palace to palace.

The Prince's wealth came partly from the great number of peasants who owed him a portion of the fruits of their labours. He also had his own enterprises, directed by his staff, notably sheep raising. Of his enormous flock, Abbott relates:

Not long ago he visited England, and was a guest of the Lord of Holkham, one of the most wealthy proprietors of that island. While looking upon a very beautiful flock of two thousand sheep, the Lord of Holkham inquired if Esterhazy could show as fine a flock upon his estates. The wealthy baron smilingly replied, " My shepherds are more numerous than your sheep." This was literally true, for Esterhazy has two thousand five hundred shepherds. 

Despite his great wealth, Paul managed to spend beyond his means, getting into financial trouble just as his father had. According to the Encyclopædia Britannica Eleventh Edition, "the last years of his life were spent in comparative poverty and isolation, as even the Esterházy-Forchtenstein estates were unequal to the burden of supporting his fabulous extravagance and had to be placed in the hands of curators." His successor Nikolaus III got out of debt in part by selling the famous family art collection.

Career as diplomat and politician

While most of Paul's ancestors had served the Empire as military officers, Paul instead pursued a career in diplomacy, and later politics.

In 1806 he was secretary of the embassy in London, and in 1807 worked with Metternich in the same capacity in Paris. In 1810 he was accredited to the court of Dresden, where he tried in vain to detach Saxony from Napoleon, and in 1814 he accompanied his father on a secret mission to Rome. He took a leading part in all the diplomatic negotiations consequent upon the wars of 1813–1815, especially at the Congress of Châtillon. After the Congress of Vienna (1815) he was appointed as ambassador to the United Kingdom at the request of the Prince Regent. His wife Maria Theresia became extremely popular in London, and was a patroness of Almack's club, the centre of fashionable society. In 1824 he represented Austria as ambassador extraordinary at the coronation of Charles X of France, and was the premier Austrian commissioner at the London conferences of 1830–1836.

In 1842 Paul returned to Hungary and became a member of the Conservative Party, which supported the Habsburg supremacy and did not favour the reform experiments. On 7 April 1848 he was appointed as Minister beside the King in the first cabinet of Hungary which was controlled by Count Lajos Batthyány. His role was as the mediator between Vienna and the Hungarian government. Seeing that his pacifying intentions ended in failure, he resigned from his position in September. Later Esterházy took connections with the immigrated politicians.

He was Minister besides the King during the Hungarian Revolution of 1848. At the time of the Napoleonic Wars, he worked for the Austrian Empire as a diplomat. He tried to form diplomatic associations for Vienna, (for example with the Kingdom of Saxony), but he did not achieve any results. Despite this failure, Esterházy remained a famous and acknowledged politician.

Notes

References
Abbott, John Stevens Cabot (1848) Kings and queens: or, Life in the palace: consisting of historical sketches of Josephine and Maria Louisa, Louis Philippe, Ferdinand of Austria, Nicholas, Isabella II., Leopold, and Victoria.  New York:  Harper and Brothers.  Available on line at 

Magyar Életrajzi Lexikon

|- 
! colspan="3" style="background: #ACE777; color: #000000" | Hungarian nobility

1786 births
1866 deaths
Nobility from Vienna
Foreign ministers of Hungary
Members of the Hungarian Academy of Sciences
Paul Anton III
Paul Anton III
Knights of the Golden Fleece of Austria
Honorary Knights Grand Cross of the Order of the Bath
Ambassadors of Austria to the United Kingdom